The George Dean House is a historic house located at 135 Winthrop Street in Taunton, Massachusetts.

Description and history 
The house was built in 1871 in the Italianate style. The -story, gable front house originally contained clapboard siding with decorative window trims and a large wraparound porch with detailed wood posts. The attic also had two semi-round windows under the front gable.

It was added to the National Register of Historic Places on July 5, 1984. However, since that time, the house has been covered with vinyl siding and the original windows and decorative wood trim has been removed. The large porch has also been altered.

See also
National Register of Historic Places listings in Taunton, Massachusetts

References

National Register of Historic Places in Taunton, Massachusetts
Houses in Taunton, Massachusetts
Houses on the National Register of Historic Places in Bristol County, Massachusetts
Houses completed in 1871
Italianate architecture in Massachusetts